is a Japanese politician who is currently the governor of Ishikawa Prefecture. He served as the Minister of Education, Culture, Sports, Science and Technology under Prime Minister Shinzō Abe. Prior to his appointment in the Cabinet, he also served as a member of the House of Representatives of the National Diet, representing the 1st district of Ishikawa Prefecture.

Hase is also a semi-retired professional wrestler who worked for New Japan Pro-Wrestling (NJPW) and All Japan Pro Wrestling (AJPW). During his affiliation with AJPW, he also served as the chairman for the Pacific Wrestling Federation (PWF), which is the governing body for all championships in AJPW. Among other title wins, Hase held the WCW International World Heavyweight Championship once, making him a one-time world champion.

Early life
Hase graduated from Senshu University in March 1984. He then became a teacher of classic Japanese literature in a high school in Ishikawa Prefecture, before pursuing a professional wrestling career in 1985.

Hase also became an amateur wrestler, representing Japan at the 1984 Summer Olympics in Los Angeles. He placed ninth in the Greco-Roman wrestling tournament.

Professional wrestling career

Early years (1986–1987)
Originally trained by Riki Choshu, Hiroshi Hase began his pro wrestling career in February 1986, at Carlos Colón's World Wrestling Council in Puerto Rico. Later that year, Hase went to Calgary, Alberta, Canada, where he was trained by Stu Hart and Tokyo Joe. He would wrestle in Stampede Wrestling, under a mask, in a tag team known as the Viet Cong Express with Fumihiro Niikura, with whom he held the Stampede International Tag Team Championship. By 1987, he started to wrestle under his name and unmasked in Stampede Wrestling. By the end of 1987, Hase would return to Japan.

New Japan Pro-Wrestling (1987–1996)
When he returned to Japan, Hase wrestled for NJPW's junior heavyweight division, winning the IWGP Junior Heavyweight Championship twice. He defeated Kuniaki Kobayashi on December 27, 1987, and held it until May 27, 1988, losing the title to Owen Hart. His second reign began by defeating Shiro Koshinaka on March 16, 1989, and held it until May 25, 1989, losing it to Jushin Liger. In June 1989, Hase and Takayuki Iizuka went to the Soviet Union to be trained in sambo, where he learned one of his signature moves, the uranage. He would also become one of the only wrestlers, Japanese or American, to successfully graduate from the junior heavyweight to heavyweight class.

In the 1990s, Hase had many memorable encounters with famous Japanese talents first in New Japan, and later All Japan. In June 1990, Hase had a near-death experience in the ring, after being knocked out by a backdrop from Tatsutoshi Goto. Hase would form a successful tag team with Kensuke Sasaki in March 1990, winning the IWGP Tag Team Championship twice. On November 1, 1990, Hase and Sasaki defeated Masahiro Chono and Keiji Muto to win the title and held on to the titles until December 26, 1990, losing them to Super Strong Machine and Hiro Saito. Their second reign came by regaining them from Machine and Saito on March 6, 1991, but lost the titles on March 21, 1991, to the Steiner Brothers. Hase was involved in a classic December 14, 1992, encounter with The Great Muta, in which the "Muta Scale" was created, due to the incredible amount of blood shed by Muta, which was payback for Muta bloodying Hase on September 14, 1990.

Hase and Muto were also regular tag team partners; they won the IWGP Tag Team Championship twice. Their first reign began on November 5, 1991, defeating Rick Steiner and Scott Norton in a decision match. They would hold on to the belts until March 1, 1992, losing them to Big Van Vader and Bam Bam Bigelow. Hase and Muto won the Super Grade Tag League in November 1993, defeating The Jurassic Powers in the final. On March 16, 1994, Hase defeated Rick Rude to win the WCW International World Heavyweight Championship, and he re-lost the title to Rude on March 24, 1994. Hase and Muto won their second Super Grade Tag League in October 1994. On November 25, 1994, Hase and Muto defeated The Hellraisers to win their second IWGP Tag Team title. They would hold on to the titles until May 1995, as they vacated the titles after Muto won the IWGP Heavyweight Championship.

While still IWGP Tag Team Champion, Hase travelled to North Korea to participate in Collision in Korea in April 1995. At the two-night event, he defeated Chris Benoit on the first night then teamed up with his old tag team partner Sasaki against the Steiner Brothers on the second night.

The following year he announced his retirement from New Japan, only to jump to the rival All Japan Pro Wrestling. His last singles bout as a NJPW wrestler was against Kensuke Sasaki on January 4, 1996. He wrestled one more match for NJPW on July 26, 1996, teaming with Sasaki, losing to Riki Choshu and Yuji Nagata.

All Japan Pro-Wrestling (1997–2006)
After a brief hiatus, he made his return to pro wrestling in All Japan Pro Wrestling (AJPW) in January 1997. In All Japan, Hase did not contend for any top titles despite his name recognition, as he made politics his full-time job.

In 2000, he founded the multi-promotional Bad Ass Translate Trading stable with Keiji Muto, Taiyō Kea and Jinsei Shinzaki; Hase and Muto reformed their team to battle Jun Akiyama and Yuji Nagata on October 8, the rising stars of their respective promotions (NOAH and NJPW), and were defeated in a ceremonial passing of the torch match that highlighted the advancement of professional wrestling in Japan.

When Muto (along with Satoshi Kojima and Kendo Ka Shin) jumped to All Japan the following year, Hase was seen as having influenced them (if not Muto at least) in their decision. Antonio Inoki, who had once preceded Hase to the Japanese Diet, blasted Hase and suggested that he resign his position in the Diet, but nothing came out of this.

Hase's final match for 11 years occurred on August 27, 2006. He tagged with Katsuhiko Nakajima and Satoshi Kojima to face Taru, Suwama and "brother" Yasshi of the Voodoo Murderers. The match was originally supposed to have Kensuke Sasaki in it to team with Hase and Kojima, but he was replaced with Nakajima following an eye injury. Sasaki was still a presence in the match, working ringside to keep Voodoo Murders' heelish antics at bay and entering the ring at one point. Hase pinned Yasshi with a Northern Light Suplex for the victory, ending his in-ring career after 20 years. A week later, he was elected into the Wrestling Observer Newsletter Hall of Fame.

Retirement
On July 10, 2007, Hase took over the duty of the Pacific Wrestling Federation chairman, after Stan Hansen (who held the position since 2000) voluntarily resigned from the position. On March 17, 2013, Hase announced that he was stepping down as chairman for the PWF after nearly six years. His last day as PWF chairman was June 21, 2013.

On July 26, 2017, Hase returned to the ring at a Pro Wrestling Masters event, produced by Keiji Muto. Wrestling his first match in 11 years, Hase teamed with Riki Choshu and Tatsumi Fujinami to defeat The Great Muta, The Great Kabuki and TNT in a six-man tag team match. On August 5, 2018, Hiroshi Hase was revealed as the special partner of Riki Choshu and Jun Akiyama on an All Japan show, victorious against Naoya Nomura, Yoshitatsu and Kazma Sakamoto. On August 21, as he teamed up with Taiyō Kea, Shinjiro Otani, and Jinsei Shinzaki for a special one-night BATT reunion on Muto's Pro Wrestling Masters; defeating the Heisei Ishingun team of Akira, Akitoshi Saito, Shiro Koshinaka and Masashi Aoyagi. Since then, Hase has made two one-off appearances for Pro Wrestling NOAH, most recently on January 1, 2023, teaming up with Kazuyuki Fujita, Nosawa Rongai and Kendo Kashin in a winning effort against Masakatsu Funaki, Katsuhiko Nakajima, Manabu Soya and Hajime Ohara.

Reputation
Among his peers, Hase is highly regarded as one of the most unselfish wrestlers in the professional wrestling industry, always willing to put anyone over. Hase also had the honor of learning under both Antonio Inoki and Giant Baba, making him one of the few that learned under both men.

Political career
In July 1995, Hase was elected into the Japanese House of Councillors, the upper house of the National Diet, as an independent candidate representing the Ishikawa Prefecture. This made him the second professional wrestler-turned-politician to be elected in a parliamentary seat, the first being Antonio Inoki.

In 2000, he was elected as a member of the House of Representatives, representing Ishikawa Prefecture. From 2005 to 2006, he also served as the Senior Vice Minister of Education, Culture, Sports, Science and Technology.

As a lawmaker, Hase has primarily focused on issues involving education, welfare, sports, and environment. He is a defender of the Hague Convention and supports legislation intended to ensure visitation rights between children and their parents separated through divorce or other marital disputes in Japan.

On October 7, 2015, Prime Minister of Japan Shinzō Abe announced Hase as part of his cabinet, naming him the Minister of Education, Culture, Sports, Science and Technology. He replaced Hakubun Shimomura, who stepped down from the post after being accused of mishandling the main stadium project for the 2020 Summer Olympics in Tokyo. He also led a multiparty caucus intended to examine discrimination against the LGBT community in Japan, a move that was also intended to prepare the country for the Olympics.

On March 13, 2022, Hase was elected as the Governor of Ishikawa Prefecture in a crowded race.

Personal life
In 1994, Hase married Kyoko Takami, the daughter of writer Jun Takami.

Championships and accomplishments
New Japan Pro-Wrestling
IWGP Junior Heavyweight Championship (2 times)
IWGP Tag Team Championship (4 times) – with Kensuke Sasaki (2), and Keiji Muto (2)
Super Grade Tag League (1993, 1994) – with Keiji Muto
Tag Team Best Bout (2001) with Keiji Muto vs. Jun Akiyama and Yuji Nagata on October 8
Nikkan Sports
Match of the Year (2001) – with Keiji Muto vs. Jun Akiyama and Yuji Nagata on October 8
Pro Wrestling Illustrated
PWI ranked him #80 of the top 500 singles wrestlers of the "PWI Years" in 2003
PWI ranked him #22 of the Top 100 Tag Teams of the "PWI Years" with The Great Muta in 2003
PWI ranked him #27 of the Top 100 Tag Teams of the "PWI Years" with Kensuke Sasaki in 2003
Stampede Wrestling
Stampede International Tag Team Championship (1 time) – with Fumihiro Niikura
Stampede Wrestling Hall of Fame (Class of 1995)
Tokyo Sports
Rookie of the Year (1988)
Technique Award (1991)
World Championship Wrestling
WCW International World Heavyweight Championship (1 time)1
Wrestling Observer Newsletter
Match of the Year (1991) with Kensuke Sasaki vs. Rick and Scott Steiner at the WCW/New Japan Supershow, March 21, Tokyo, Japan
Best Technical Wrestler (1993)
Wrestling Observer Newsletter Hall of Fame (Class of 2006)
1The championship was won in Tokyo, Japan as part of an interpromotional card between New Japan Pro-Wrestling and World Championship Wrestling.

References

External links
Official website of Hiroshi Hase
Official Facebook page of Hiroshi Hase
Profile from the Liberal Democratic Party of Japan
Shining Road profile

|-

1961 births
Education ministers of Japan
Government ministers of Japan
Governors of Ishikawa Prefecture
Living people
Japanese male professional wrestlers
Japanese sportsperson-politicians
Members of the House of Councillors (Japan)
Members of the House of Representatives (Japan)
People from Toyama Prefecture
Wrestlers at the 1984 Summer Olympics
Olympic wrestlers of Japan
Japanese male sport wrestlers
21st-century Japanese politicians
Stampede Wrestling alumni
Politicians from Toyama Prefecture
Sportspeople from Toyama Prefecture
IWGP Junior Heavyweight champions
Culture ministers of Japan
Science ministers of Japan
Sports ministers of Japan
Technology ministers of Japan
IWGP Heavyweight Tag Team Champions
Stampede Wrestling International Tag Team Champions